Sandro Chaves de Assis Rosa, (born May 19, 1973 in Brazil) is a Brazilian football player. He has spent most of his football career in Japan since he moved to Japan to complete his high school studies.

He played for FC Tokyo and Oita Trinita in the J1 League before moving to Polish Ekstraklasa side Pogoń Szczecin.

Club statistics

References

External links

1973 births
Living people
Brazilian footballers
Brazilian expatriate footballers
Expatriate footballers in Japan
J1 League players
J2 League players
Japan Football League (1992–1998) players
Ekstraklasa players
JEF United Chiba players
Honda FC players
FC Tokyo players
Oita Trinita players
Pogoń Szczecin players
ABC Futebol Clube players
Ceará Sporting Club players
Brazilian expatriate sportspeople in Poland
Expatriate footballers in Poland
Association football defenders